Joseph Adolphe François Thas (born 13 October 1944, Dilbeek, Belgium) is a Belgian mathematician, who works on combinatorics, incidence geometry and finite geometries.

Thas received in 1969 his PhD from Ghent University under Julien Bilo with thesis Een studie betreffende de projective rechte over de totale matrix algebra  der 3x3-matrices met elementen in een algebraïsch afgesloten veld K. Thas showed how to extend projective geometry and cross-ratios with the concept of a projective line over a ring.

Thas is an emeritus professor at Ghent University.

Awards and honors
In 1994 Thas received the Euler medal. In 1998 he gave an invited address at the International Congress of Mathematicians in Berlin with lecture Finite geometries, varieties and codes. He received in 1969 the prize of the Royal Academy of Sciences, Letters and Fine Arts of Belgium, in 1970 the Scientific Louis Empain Award and in the same year the François Deruyts prize of the Royal Academy of Belgium.

In 1988 he became a member of the Royal Flemish Academy of Belgium for Science and the Arts; he was vice-director of the Class of Sciences in 1998 and director in 1999. In 1999 he was  awarded an Erskine Fellowship of the University of Canterbury, New Zealand, in 2008 he was Platinum Jubilee Lecturer at the Indian Statistical Institute, and in 2012 he became one of the inaugural fellows of the American Mathematical Society.

Selected works
with Koen Thas, H. Van Maldeghem Translation generalized quadrangles, World Scientific 2006
with Stanley E. Payne Finite generalized quadrangles, Pitman 1984, 2nd edition, European Mathematical Society 2009
with J. W. P. Hirschfeld General Galois Geometries, Oxford University Press 1991
Projective geometry over a finite field and Generalized Polygons in F. Buekenhout Handbook of incidence geometry, North Holland 1995
with J. Bilo Enkele aspecten van de theorie der axiomatische projectieve vlakken, Simon Stevin, Supplement, Vol. 55, 1981
(For a complete list of papers see Homepage in Ghent.)

References

External links
 Homepage in Ghent
 search on author JA Thas from Google Scholar
  

1944 births
Living people
20th-century Belgian mathematicians
21st-century Belgian mathematicians
Combinatorialists
Fellows of the American Mathematical Society
People from Dilbeek